Francis Farmer may refer to:

 Frances Farmer (1913–1970), American actress and television host
 Frances Farmer (librarian) (1909–1993), American jurist
 Francis Mark Farmer (1866–1922), dental surgeon and lecturer